Quaker City is a sound system based in Handsworth in Birmingham, England, playing as far afield as London, Bristol, Manchester and Leeds.

It was founded in 1964 by Karl Irving, who was born in Montego Bay, Jamaica, but emigrated to Birmingham. Originally playing ska, it later focused on reggae.

References

Sound systems
Music in Birmingham, West Midlands